Adam Newbold (born 16 November 1989) is an English footballer who plays as a striker. In December 2010, it was announced that he had agreed a deal to sign for Australian side Ballarat Red Devils. He made his debut for the club in February.

Career
Newbold scored on his debut for Nottingham Forest after coming on as a 75th minute substitute against Morecambe in the League Cup on 13 August 2008, which finished as a 4–0 victory. His Football League debut came three days later in a 3–1 defeat to Swansea City in the Championship by making a substitute appearance on 87 minutes. In November 2008, Newbold signed a new one-and-a-half-year contract at the City Ground, with the option of a one-year extension.

Following the dismissal of Forest boss Colin Calderwood, and the subsequent appointment of Billy Davies, Newbold joined Conference North club Stalybridge Celtic on loan until the end of the 2008–09 season on 26 March 2009. He made his debut two days later, scoring a goal in the process, only for it to ruled out by the linesman who adjudged him to be offside. He finished the loan with six appearances, scoring an impressive 5 goals. His contract was mutually terminated by Forest after the club's reserve team was disbanded by the new management team, leaving many of the club's talented young players without a club.

In December 2009, he signed for Tamworth of the Conference National on non-contract terms, following a brief spell in Scotland. After it was revealed the club was under financial difficulties, Newbold left Tamworth and signed for Hucknall Town F.C., despite being thought to be the transfer target for a number of league clubs. Newbold left Hucknall without making a single appearance for the club after deciding that he would look to get back into the professional game.

In February/March 2011 Newbold joined the Ballarat Red Devils on non-contract terms. It took Newbold just 26 minutes of his debut for the Red Devils and Australian soccer to find the back of the net. He was on target during a 5–1 romp over Langwarrin, where he was named man of the match and hailed by local newspaper Silobreaker as a standout.

References

External links

1989 births
Living people
English footballers
Association football forwards
Nottingham Forest F.C. players
Stalybridge Celtic F.C. players
Tamworth F.C. players
Hucknall Town F.C. players
Ballarat City FC players
English Football League players
Footballers from Nottingham